How to Break a Terrorist: The US Interrogators Who Used Brains, Not Brutality, to Take Down the Deadliest Man in Iraq is a 2008 book written by an American airman who played a key role in tracking down Abu Musab al-Zarqawi.

Background

The interrogator who wrote the book published it under the pen name Matthew Alexander, for security reasons. The author wrote the book as a pseudonymous officer in the US Air Force who had served for fourteen years. Alexander's real name has been sealed by court order by the District of Columbia District Court. Alexander makes television appearances under his pseudonym.
According to Jeff Stein, writing in The Washington Post, the author's real name was Anthony Camerino, a Major in the United States Air Force Reserve.
In an op-ed published in The Washington Post, Alexander wrote that after his arrival in Iraq in 2006 he found:

The author has stated that when the Pentagon vetted the book they initially made 93 redactions.

Alexander is an outspoken opponent of torture. He refutes the effectiveness of torture, citing its negative long-term effects such as recruiting for Al-Qaeda. He also argues that torture is contrary to the American principles of freedom, liberty, and justice, and that should they resort to torture, American interrogators become the enemy they serve to defeat. Similar arguments have been made by other former interrogators from the U.S. military, FBI, and the CIA, including Colonel Steven Kleinman. In an interview with human rights lawyer Scott Horton for Harper's Magazine, Alexander said

Alexander described Marc Thiessen's 2010 book Courting Disaster, which defended the use of torture (referred to euphemistically as enhanced interrogation techniques), as "a literary defense of war criminals".

References

2008 non-fiction books
Military books
Iraq War books
Torture
Interrogation techniques
Works published under a pseudonym
United States Air Force